Deh-e Sheykh (also Romanized as Deh-e Sheykh, Deh Sheikh, and Deh Sheykh; also known as Sheykh) is a village in Susan-e Gharbi Rural District, Susan District, Izeh County, Khuzestan Province, Iran. At the 2006 census, its population was 208, in 43 families.

References 

Populated places in Izeh County